Luis González (born 18 January 1955) is a Puerto Rican freestyle skier. He competed in the men's moguls event at the 1992 Winter Olympics.

References

External links
 

1955 births
Living people
Puerto Rican male freestyle skiers
Olympic freestyle skiers of Puerto Rico
Freestyle skiers at the 1992 Winter Olympics
Place of birth missing (living people)